Lucas Cruz Senra (born 26 December 1974 in Barcelona) is a Spanish computer engineer, mostly known as a rally racing co-driver and experienced navigator.

Career
He started to race on 1994, when he race on the Catalonia Rally Championship. On 2001, he achieved his first victory in the Spanish Championship, together with the driver Txus Jaio on board a Ford Focus WRC, as part of the Carlos Sainz Junior Team.

After a few years racing on tarmac and gravel categories, he started to compete on off-road races with the driver José Luis Monterde, finishing the 2001 Dakar Rally as the first classified rookies and amateurs, driving a Nissan Patrol GR.

He tackled 2006 Dakar Rally as a truck co-driver for the Volkswagen Motorsport team, partnering with driver Josep Pujol.

On 2007 he signed for Mitsubishi, where he stayed for two years, along with Nani Roma as new teammate. They attended to 2007 and 2009 Dakar Rally, achieving 10th place as the best result on final classification. They also finished 2nd on Rally Transibérico and Baja Spain competitions on 2007, and 2nd again on the 2008 Baja Spain.

In May 2009, Cruz returned to Volkswagen team, this time to share the cockpit with former World Champion Carlos Sainz. The pairing achieved their first successes after winning the Rally dos Sertões and the Silk Way Rally. The team formed by Sainz-Cruz completed their most important achievement after winning the 2010 Dakar Rally, ahead of another two Volkswagen cars, driven by Nasser Al-Attiyah and Mark Miller, respectively.

Cruz has gone onto win the 2018 Dakar Rally and 2020 Dakar Rally alongside Carlos Sainz, driving for Peugeot and Mini respectively.

Dakar Rally results

Notes

References

External links 

 

1974 births
Living people
Dakar Rally drivers
Catalan rally drivers
Off-road racing drivers
Dakar Rally co-drivers